The Foreign Military Financing (FMF) program provides grants and loans to help countries purchase weapons and defense equipment produced in the United States as well as acquiring defense services and military training. FMF funds purchases are made through the Foreign Military Sales (FMS) program, which manages government-to-government sales. On a much less frequent basis, FMF also funds purchases made through the Direct Commercial Sales (DCS) program, which oversees sales between foreign governments and private U.S. companies. FMF does not provide cash grants to other countries; it generally pays for sales of specific goods or services through FMS or DCS.

The State Department's Bureau of Political-Military Affairs and the latter's Office of Security Assistance set policy for the FMF program, while the Defense Security Cooperation Agency (DSCA), within the Defense Department, manages it on a day-to-day basis. Security Assistance Organizations (SAOs), military personnel in U.S. embassies overseas, play a key role in managing FMF within recipient countries. Some FMF pays for SAO salaries and operational costs. Congress appropriates funds for FMF through the yearly Foreign Operations Appropriations Act.

FMF exists primarily to fund arms transfers, as military training is normally granted through the International Military Education and Training (IMET) program. However, FMF does support a good deal of training.

Allocation of Foreign Military Financing

By account, program area and program element

The allocation of FMF by account, program area and program element is:

By country

From 2003 to 2007 Iraq was the largest beneficiary of FMF, since then it is Afghanistan. Until 2003 it was Israel. Other countries in the Middle East and Greater Middle East (including Pakistan, Jordan, and especially Egypt) are among the other major recipients of FMF funds.

The allocation of FMF by country is:

See also 
United States military aid

References

External links
U.S. Department of Defense
U.S. Department of State
U.S. Department of State Foreign Military Financing Account Summary
Defense Security Cooperation Agency
"Report: U.S. Routinely Sends Arms to Undemocratic Nations", on Democracy Now!, May 27, 2005 (video, audio, and print transcript).

Military industry
Foreign Military Sales
United States foreign policy
United States military policies
FMF
FMF
United States military aid